Capital Complex FC generally known as CCFC in Arunachal Pradesh  is an Indian  football club based in Itanagar, Arunachal Pradesh, it's women's team competed in the Indian Women's League. It's men's team competes in Indrajit Namchoom Arunachal League.

Honours

League 

 Indrajit Namchoom Arunachal League
 Runners-up (2): 2017, 2020

Women's team 

 Arunachal Women's League
 Champions (2): 2017, 2018

References 

Football clubs in North East India
Association football clubs established in 2003
2003 establishments in India
Women's football clubs in India
 Arunachal Pradesh